Richard T. Slone is a self-taught artist residing in the United States. He was born in 1974 in Newton-in-Furness, Lancashire, a northern English town. His work rose in popularity in the early 2000's when it began being noticed by celebrities and art connoisseurs. His work has been commissioned and purchased by many global celebrities, as well as used for large scale events all over the world.  

Slone's art has become popular with notable collectors including Donald Trump, Hugh Hefner, Glenn Schaeffer, Muhammad Ali, Nelson Mandela and many more. His work has graced the covers of many magazines, including the Ring Magazine, KO Magazine, World Boxing Magazine and many more. His work has been used by many companies and advertising agencies, including Everlast. He is the Official Artist of the International Boxing Hall of Fame, a title he has held since the age of 23.
In 2007 Slone's artwork was used by the Ultimate Fighting Championship UFC to create a clothing line named 'Ultimate'. The line consisted of limited edition clothing with Slone's artwork printed on the garments.

Slone has painted portraits of people including Nelson Mandela, Hugh Hefner, Donald Trump and Lennox Lewis. He has also painted fighters from the UFC, including a landscape of Chuck Liddell entitled 'The Iceman Cometh', and a landscape of Andrei Arlovski vs. Paul Buentello, which was originally painted as two separate portraits but pieced together and made into an official licensed UFC poster.  He is currently working on a huge oil portrait for rap star Eminem.

Biography

Early Life 
Slone is the son of a blacksmith, and he grew up in a farming village in Cumbria, England. He spent his formative years roaming the countryside where his lifelong love of art was born. He left home at the age of 16 to pursue an offer to become a boxer under the guidance of boxing great Joe Frazier, who guided his boxing career until Slone's love for art motivated him to pivot to painting.

2005 - Present Day 
In 2005 international art investors bought an entire series of Slone originals. The interest and demand in his art in recent years has been phenomenal, the Art company was formed in 2005 and two art dealers were brought in to cater to Slone's rapidly growing clientele.

Slone paints with great detail, bold colors and often uses Acrylic and Enamels.

In 2007 Foxwoods Casino and Resort commissioned Slone to paint their 100th boxing event. Slone also signed a multi-year deal with National Geographic/Hampton Brown who will publish some of his work.

In 2010 Slone was selected to paint the Official artwork for Bafana Bafana, the South African football team for the 2010 Fifa World Cup.

His artwork has been used on the official posters and programs for most major boxing events in the last 15 years, including Mayweather vs Pacquiao, Canelo vs Golovkin and Mayweather vs McGregor.

References

Richard T. Slone's official website
Source of details of Foxwoods deal

1974 births
Living people
20th-century English painters
English male painters
21st-century English painters
People from Newton-in-Furness
20th-century English male artists
21st-century English male artists